Founders Online is a research website providing free access to a digitized collection representing the papers of seven of the most influential figures in the founding of the United States. Among the 185,000 documents available through the website's searchable database are the papers of John Adams, Benjamin Franklin, Alexander Hamilton, John Jay, Thomas Jefferson, James Madison, and George Washington. The database also includes correspondence between these Founders and hundreds of other figures. The website is a cooperative venture between the National Historical Publications and Records Commission (NHPRC), the grant-making arm of the National Archives, and The University of Virginia Press.

Collected papers of Founding Fathers
The Founders Online website, launched on June 13, 2013, enables students, researchers, scholars, and the general public to read what the Founders wrote and debated in the years leading up to and following the nation's formation. The subjects they discussed between themselves and others ranged from public policies and democratic principles to slavery and the Constitution. The works available also provide insight into the Founders' friendships and personal lives.

The website's collection is the result of a 50-year effort by scholars to locate, transcribe, annotate, and digitize 18th and 19th century documents held by archives worldwide. From these works, hundreds of individual volumes have been published that can also be accessed.

The collection is derived from the letterpress editions of the Founders' original papers, which were drawn from the following sources:

John Adams ― Massachusetts Historical Society and Harvard University Press
Benjamin Franklin ― Yale University Press
Alexander Hamilton ― Columbia University Press
Thomas Jefferson ― Princeton University Press
John Jay, James Madison, and George Washington ― University of Virginia Press

Besides the complete works of these individuals, Founders Online includes the selected papers of John Jay, first Chief Justice of the U.S. Supreme Court. Eventually, the website's collection is expected to exceed 200,000 documents. The website is based at the University of Virginia in Charlottesville.

Funding
The website's editorial work is made possible through federal funding from the National Historical Publications and Records Commission and the National Endowment for the Humanities. Additional major funding is provided by a wide range of foundations, corporations, and private individuals. Also sponsoring Founders Online's editorial projects are The University of Virginia, Princeton University, Massachusetts Historical Society, Columbia University. Yale University, American Philosophical Society, University of Chicago, and Thomas Jefferson Foundation at Monticello.

See also
 The Washington Papers
 The Papers of Thomas Jefferson
 Adams Papers Editorial Project
 The Papers of James Madison
 The Selected Papers of John Jay
 University of Virginia Press
 Founding Fathers of the United States

References

External links
Founders Online
National Archives and Records Administration
 The Papers of Benjamin Franklin, Yale University
YouTube: Founders Online

United States documents
Political leaders of the American Revolution
History websites of the United States
Reference websites